Huntley School is an Anglican independent boarding preparatory school in Marton, New Zealand. As of 2014 is currently co-educational, after being a boys-only school for 117 years.

It was founded in 1896 by Charles Mather and Basil Wilson on Calico Line as a small school for children of the farmers in Marton. The school is now located on Wanganui Road. The school moved in 1900. The building has been rebuilt since the move. A nail from the original building is kept ceremonially by the headmaster.

The school has large grounds, including several sports fields, a Chapel (which celebrated its Centennial in 2009), a Gymnasium and an Arts and Technology block.

Huntley has 155 students in 5 squads named after the previous headmasters- Mather, Wilson, Rix-Trott, Strombom and Sherriff. They compete in various challenges such as Swimming Sports and Cross Country Running. About 100 are full-time (3 week intervals between exeats) boarders, while the remaining 50 are day students. Lunch is provided for all students every day.

The school is strong in many aspects. Academically, it does well in ICAS examinations, Otago Problem Solving and Mathex. Culture is taken very seriously- the Huntley Jazz Band often compete locally  and there is also annual Public Speaking and Debating competitions. The school is also quite strong in sports- every student is expected to do a sport- competing strongly in competitions and in sporting fixtures with other schools. The Chapel of St. Barnabas had its centennial in 2009. There is a service in the chapel every Monday, Thursday and Friday morning, and on Sunday evening. Social opportunities are also found, as there is a social with Carncot in Term 2 and Term 4.

Notable students
 Philip Cooke (1893–1956), judge

References

External links
 http://www.huntley.school.nz/

Schools in Manawatū-Whanganui
Anglican schools in New Zealand
Independent schools in New Zealand
Boarding schools in New Zealand
Educational institutions established in 1896
1896 establishments in New Zealand